Remarks on Nominalization is a seminal linguistic paper on English nominalization by Noam Chomsky published in 1970. X-bar theory was first proposed in this paper.

References

External links
Remarks on Nominalization

1970 essays
Works by Noam Chomsky
Social science essays
Syntactic relationships
Generative syntax
Syntax